Joan Sisiati Tahafa Viliamu (born 22 March 1966) is a Niuean politician and former Cabinet minister.

Viliamu was born in Tuapa and educated at Matalave Primary School and Niue High School Intermediate. She worked as a public servant and businesswoman before being elected to the Niue Assembly on the common roll at the 2011 election. Following the election she was appointed to Cabinet as Minister of Health, the Community Sector, and Minister for the Niue Broadcasting Corporation. She was re-elected in the 2014 Niuean general election but downgraded to an Assistant Minister. She was again re-elected at the 2017 election, but lost her seat at the 2020 election.

References

1966 births
Living people
Members of the Niue Assembly
Social affairs ministers of Niue
Health ministers of Niue
Women's ministers of Niue
Women government ministers of Niue
21st-century New Zealand women politicians
21st-century New Zealand politicians